Pollex taurus is a moth of the family Erebidae first described by Michael Fibiger in 2007. It is known from Mindanao in the Philippines.

The wingspan is about 13 mm. The forewing is narrow and light brown, except for the dark brown basal and subterminal areas. The hindwing is unicolorous dark brown with an indistinct black discal spot and the underside unicolorous dark brown.

References

Micronoctuini
Taxa named by Michael Fibiger
Moths described in 2007